James Douglas Annand (13 July 1875 – 13 July 1952) was an Australian politician and mayor of Toowoomba, Queensland. Serving for 22 years between 1924 and 1952, he was Toowoomba's longest-serving mayor. Born in Ipswich but raised in Toowoomba, he operated a drapery business for many years and also owned land near Hannaford in the Surat district.

Mayor of Toowoomba
Annand was mayor of Toowoomba for three separate terms from 1924–1930, 1933–1949, and June 1952-August 1952. As mayor, one of his major projects was the construction of the Cooby Dam.

State politics
Annand represented the seat of Toowoomba from 1929–1932 and East Toowoomba from 1934–1935.

Personal life
Annand had married Isabella Julia Walker on 17 March 1904. He died in Brisbane in 1952 and was cremated at Mount Thompson crematorium.

References

External links
  — available online

1952 deaths
Mayors of Toowoomba
People from Ipswich, Queensland
1875 births